John C. White may refer to: 

John Campbell White (disambiguation)
John Campbell White, 1st Baron Overtoun (1843–1908), Scottish chemicals manufacturer
John Campbell White (Irish politician) (died 1923), High Sheriff of Belfast and Lord Mayor of Belfast
John Campbell White (diplomat) (1884–1967), American diplomat, US ambassador to Haiti and Peru
John Coyle White (1924–1995), American politician from Texas
John White (Louisiana politician) (born 1975), American politician from Louisiana